Blackout is a children's picture book written and illustrated by John Rocco, published by Disney Hyperion in 2011. It features a New York City family during an electrical power outage. During the blackout, the lack of distraction by their technological devices leads to a renewal of the family members' connections with each other.

Blackout was a 2012 Caldecott Honor Book, one runner-up for the annual Caldecott Medal. Fox 2000 has optioned it for a live-action feature. In 2013, the book was made into an animated film narrated by Stanley Tucci.

References

2011 children's books
American picture books
Caldecott Honor-winning works